Kwato Island an island in China Strait, Milne Bay Province, Papua New Guinea.

Administration 
The island belongs to Logea North Ward, which belongs to Bwanabwana Rural Local Level Government Area LLG, Samarai-Murua District, which are in Milne Bay Province.

History 
In 1891, Rev Charles Abel and his wife Beatrice commenced a mission on this island, which developed into a non-hierarchical church, and self-supporting mission, teaching boat-building, agriculture and management skills.

Geography 
The island is part of the Logea group, itself a part of Samarai Islands of the Louisiade Archipelago.

Economy 
The islanders, like other from Samarai Islands are experts in boat building.

Demographics 
The population of 66 is split between 2 villages: Kwato missionary which is inland, and Isuhina which is on the coast.

Transportation 
There is a dock on the island.

References

Islands of Milne Bay Province
Louisiade Archipelago